Nelsonia may refer to:
Nelsonia (rodent), a genus of Mexican rodents in the family Cricetidae
Nelsonia (plant), a plant genus in the family Acanthaceae
Nelsonia, a synonym of Abatetia, a genus of flies in the family Dolichopodidae
Paleonelsonia, a trilobite genus formerly known as Nelsonia
Nelsonia, New Zealand, a geographical area covering the northern South Island of New Zealand
Nelsonia, Virginia, an unincorporated community in Virginia
3538 Nelsonia, an asteroid